A municipal advisory council in the United States is an organization composed of elected or appointed members whose purpose is to advise a city or county government about the activities and problems of the area represented.

In California state government, for example, the councils serve unincorporated communities as links to county boards of supervisors under authorization of a 1971 legislative statute, amended in 1978.

Such a council is an advisory body of local citizens elected by the community or appointed by the board of supervisors with the purpose of representing the community to the board. Although a municipal advisory council is a governing body, it has no fiscal authority or administrative organization. Because it lacks authority to implement its position directly, it seeks to accomplish its goals through county government.  A number of these Municipal Advisory Councils, such as East Palo Alto and Isla Vista, have initiated incorporation proposals to create new cities out of formerly unincorporated areas.  The former succeeded in 1999 while the later failed twice in 1974 and 1976 and remains orphaned 

 These councils face two ways: toward the county, offering the views of the community; and toward the community, supplying information about county proposals and a place where individuals can air opinions on community problems and perhaps receive help. The councils hold public meetings, survey community opinion and speak for the community to the board of supervisors. The most common subject of activity is land-use planning. The county often uses the group as a planning advisory council to draft or revise the community's portion of the county general plan.In 1977, the California State Office of Planning and Research conducted an extensive study on Municipal Advisory Councils up to that point evaluating their effectiveness and usefulness.  Beth Meyerson-Martinez studied MACs again in her Fall 1985 thesis "Municipal Advisory Councils: An Alternative for the Unincorporated Community" focusing specifically on Stanislaus County.  There has been little substantive research on the subject since then.

Controversy 

Some residents of unincorporated communities represented by MAC boards have raised concerns about their representatives being appointed rather than elected. This issue arises time and again with Alameda County's Castro Valley MAC, which is purported to be composed of the appointing supervisor's campaign donors. This issue of "elected vs. appointed" arose in Stanislaus County in November 2018 when the county sent letters to their MACs notifying them this change would be implemented. After some protests, Stanislaus County decided to let their MAC boards vote on the issue in January and February 2019.

List of municipal advisory councils

California
 Alamo, Contra Costa, 
 Bay Point, Contra Costa, 
 Bethel Island, Contra Costa, 
 Bloomington, San Bernardino County
 Byron, Contra Costa, 
 Cascadel Woods, Madera County, 1984 
 Castro Valley, Alameda County, 1981 
 Contra Costa Centre, Contra Costa, 
 Denair, Stanislaus County, 1992, 
 Donner Summit, Placer County, 2010 
 East Richmond Heights, Contra Costa, 2017 
 El Mirage, San Bernardino County
 El Sobrante, Contra Costa, 
 Foresthill Forum, Placer County, 2005 
 Granite Bay, Placer County, 2005 
 Greater Eureka Area, Humboldt County, 
 Hickman, Stanislaus, 1994 
 Inyokern, Kern County, 1983 
 Kensington, Contra Costa, 
 Knights Ferry, Stanislaus, 1983 
 Keyes, Stanislaus, 1994 
 Knightsen, Contra Costa, 
 McKinleyville, Humboldt County, 
 Meadow Vista, Placer County, 1989 
 Midcoast Community Council, San Mateo County, 1991 
 Middletown Area, Lake County, 2006 
 Mountain Communities, Kern County, 2009 
 North Auburn, Placer County 
 North Fair Oaks Community Council Council, San Mateo County, 1990 
 North Richmond, Contra Costa, 
 North Tahoe, Placer County, 1989 
 Oak Hills, San Bernardino County
 Olympic Valley, Placer County 
 Pacheco, Contra Costa, 
 Pescadero, San Mateo County, 1992 
 Rodeo, Contra Costa, 
 Rosamond, Kern County, 2005 
 Salida, Stanislaus County, 1984 
 Searles Valley-Trona , San Bernardino County
 South Modesto, Stanislaus, 2006 
 Temescal Canyon, Riverside County 
 Tehachapi, Kern County, 2010 
 Valley Home, Stanislaus, 2007 
 Weimer–Applegate–Colfax, Placer County, 2005 
 Winchester-Homeland,  Riverside County, 2011 
 Wood Colony, Stanislaus County, 2017 
 Wrightwood, San Bernardino County

References

Local government in the United States